Kalnica may refer to the following places:
Kálnica, Slovakia
Kalnica, Podlaskie Voivodeship (north-east Poland)
Kalnica, Lesko County in Subcarpathian Voivodeship (south-east Poland)
Kalnica, Sanok County in Subcarpathian Voivodeship (south-east Poland)